Bolshoye Grigorovo is a rural locality (a village) in Chertkovskoye Rural Settlement, Selivanovsky District, Vladimir Oblast, Russia. The population was 10 as of 2010.

Geography 
Bolshoye Grigorovo is located on the Kestromka River, 15 km north of Krasnaya Gorbatka (the district's administrative centre) by road. Pribrezhnaya is the nearest rural locality.

References 

Rural localities in Selivanovsky District
Sudogodsky Uyezd